Carol Brock (December 14, 1923, Queens – July 27, 2020, Manhasset, New York) was a food critic and founder of Les Dames d'Escoffier.  She was also a philanthropist.  The State University of New York at Cobleskill awarded her a doctorate of Humane Letters in 2016.

Early life and education
Carol Jean Lang was the only child of Charles and Helen. Her father ran a butcher shop, while her mother was a homemaker, and the family lived in Beechhurst, Queens.  She earned a home economics degree from Queens College, City University of New York and a master’s in food science from New York University.  She married accountant Emil Andrew Brock when she was 20 years old.

Career
Brock was a food journalist at the New York Daily News who strove to break what she called the "Pyrex ceiling".

Earlier, she worked for 23 years at Good Housekeeping magazine before spending three years as food editor of Parents magazine before moving to the Daily News in 1971.

She started at Good Housekeeping as an assistant food editor. Responsible for developing recipes, Brock eventually was a contributing editor for several of the magazine's cookbooks.

Death
At the age of 96, Brock died of respiratory failure at North Shore Hospital.  She was survived by sons Brian and Craig.

References

1923 births
2020 deaths
20th-century American journalists
20th-century American philanthropists
20th-century American women writers
20th-century women philanthropists
21st-century American journalists
21st-century American philanthropists
21st-century American women writers
21st-century women philanthropists
American book editors
American food writers
American founders
American magazine editors
American women critics
American women editors
American women journalists
American women philanthropists
Good Housekeeping
Journalists from New York City
Mass media people from New York (state)
New York University alumni
Organization founders
Philanthropists from New York (state)
Queens College, City University of New York alumni
Respiratory disease deaths in New York (state)
Women food writers
Women magazine editors
Women founders
Writers from Queens, New York